A martyr is a person who is put to death or endures suffering because of a belief, principle, or cause.
Martyr or martyrs may also refer to:

Films 
 Martyr (1927 film), a French silent film
 Martyr (2017 film), a Lebanese film by Mazen Khaled
 Martyrs (2008 film), a French horror film
 Martyrs (2015 film), an American remake of the French film

Music
 Martyr (band), a French Canadian metal band
 The Martyr (album), a 2011 Immortal Technique album

Songs
 "Martyr" (song), a song by Depeche Mode
 "Martyr", a song by August Burns Red from Found in Far Away Places
 "Martyr", a song by Fear Factory from Soul of a New Machine
 "Martyr", a song by Polaris from The Death of Me
 "Martyr", a song by Soilwork from Sworn to a Great Divide
 "Martyrs", a song by Betraying the Martyrs from Breathe in Life
 "Martyrs", a song by The Devil Wears Prada from 8:18
 "Martyrs", a psalm tune from the Scottish Psalter, also a set of organ variations on the tune by Kenneth Leighton
 "The Martyr", a song by Blind Guardian from Battalions of Fear
 "The Martyr", a song by the band Wally from Wally

Other uses 
 Martyr (politics)
 Martyr (surname)
 "The Martyr" (Herman Melville poem), on the assassination of Abraham Lincoln
 The Martyr (sculpture), by Rodin 
 Matt Bentley, also known as Martyr, American professional wrestler 
 Martyr (beetle), a genus of beetles in the family Carabidae
 Martyrs Bus Service, a bus and coach operator in Melbourne, Victoria, Australia
 Seoul FC Martyrs, a South Korean football team

See also
 Christian martyrs
 Martyre (disambiguation)
 Martyrs' Day
 Martyrs' Square (disambiguation)